Ethmia transversella is a moth in the family Depressariidae. The habitat consists of rain forests.

The ground color of the forewings is gray, more or less completely clouded with indistinct blackish brown. The ground color of the hindwings is semihyaline (partially glassy) whitish, but brownish along the costal area beyond the middle and on the terminal margin. Adults have been recorded in January.

References

Moths described in 1914
transversella